Harvey David White (born 19 September 2001) is an English professional footballer who plays as a midfielder for Premier League club Tottenham Hotspur and is currently on loan at Derby County.

Club career
Harvey White was born in Maidstone, Kent and attended The Holmesdale School, joining the Tottenham Hotspur Academy as a youngster. On 26 November 2020, he made his debut in the 2020–21 UEFA Europa League against Ludogorets Razgrad, coming on as a substitute. He made his first start for Tottenham on 10 January 2021 in the third round match of the FA Cup against eighth-tier Marine that finished in a 5–0 win. On 18 January 2021, White joined League One side Portsmouth on loan until the end of the season. His first league goal for Portsmouth came in an away game against Oxford United which ended 1–0. 

White returned to the Tottenham U21s after his loan and was called up to the first team by head coach Antonio Conte during the 2022 FIFA World Cup break. He played in exhibition matches against OGC Nice and Motherwell and was praised by Conte as "really, really intelligent" after the Nice game. White made his Premier League debut with Tottenham's senior squad against Crystal Palace F.C. on 4 January 2023. On 31 January 2023, White joined League One club Derby County on loan until the end of the 2022–23 season.

International career
In May 2019, White earned his first cap for the England under-18 team in a penalty shootout defeat following a 1–1 draw in extra time against Spain.

White has been promoted to the England under-21 team following impressive displays for the under-18 team.

Career statistics

Honours
Portsmouth
EFL Trophy runner-up: 2019–20

References

External links
Profile at the Tottenham Hotspur F.C. website

2001 births
Living people
Tottenham Hotspur F.C. players
Association football midfielders
England youth international footballers
Footballers from Kent
Portsmouth F.C. players
Derby County F.C. players
English footballers
English Football League players
Premier League players